"Happy Ending" is the third single release from Lebanese-British singer Mika. Taken from his debut album Life in Cartoon Motion, producer Greg Wells remixed and rearranged the single, released online on 8 October 2007, and in shops on CD and 7-inch vinyl on 15 October 2007.

The single charted as Mika's fourth straight UK Top 10 single out of his first four, continuing his UK success so far, peaking at number seven on the UK Singles Chart. It was the fifth most added song to Australian radio in late October 2007 and was released there officially on 12 November 2007, as the 3rd single despite digital track sales placing the song in the ARIA singles chart before the official release.

On Life in Cartoon Motion, fifty seconds after the song ends, a hidden track, "Over My Shoulder" starts. It is a solemn song about being left alone, cold and drunk. This also appeared on the CD single of "Grace Kelly".

Background and composition 
Mika described the story behind the song:

 "It's about a few things. In a way, it's a kind of sad break-up song like 'My Interpretation.' But, at the same time, it's about a lot of other things. I'll never forget when I was actually recording this song in Los Angeles, I would take this drive from where I was staying to the studio, which wasn't in the city and the amount of homeless people I saw on the way was absolutely shocking. Those horrible images of homelessness that I would see every morning really connected with that song. So it just comes to show you that a bright song in a certain mindset had a meaning that really evolves and changes as time goes by. I think that it is very important that other listeners find their own meaning to songs. So many people are very openly suggestive to the point of being abstract. It's the most powerful thing when that becomes the song."

The woman singing with Mika in “Happy Ending” on the album is Ida Falk Winland, an opera singer and former classmate of Mika from the Royal College of Music.

Critical reception 
The song received critical acclaim. Christian John Wikane from PopMatters commented about his voice on the track, writing that "Like a choirboy singing by candlelight, Mika awakes goose bumps with the chilling purity of his voice." Graham Griffith from About.com was succinct, writing that the song is "gorgeous", while Lizzie Ennever from BBC Music described it as a "lovely, piano-led".

John Murphy from musicOMH wrote an extense article about the song. He wrote that it "sees a wonderful vocal performance from Mika, sounding eerily like early Michael Jackson at one point, and working extraordinarily well with his backing vocals. It's the sort of song you can imagine playing over the final scene of an 'emotional' drama on TV."

Music video
The music video starts with a piano playing on its own, then the camera shows Mika on the bed. He is singing and has a pink balloon attached on his arm and while he is floating above, it reveals Mika with a pink suit. His room walls are shown full of pictures that start moving their mouths and singing with Mika. Mika passes through white balloons, which show all the times he felt different emotions. The video ends with Mika singing, and gloved hands resembling singing faces. He smiles as the screen goes black. The music video was directed by AlexandLiane.

Popular culture
The song was featured on The CW show Gossip Girl. It was also used for a contemporary dance performed by Natalli and Vincent on So You Think You Can Dance Canada. The song was featured on The CW show Privileged. The song was also used in the commercial for KB Kookmin Bank. The song can often be heard on The X Factor (UK) during the audition rounds. A Cappella group Noteworthy chose this song as their Swan Song on NBC's The Sing-Off. The instrumental version of the song was featured in the second series of Supersize vs Superskinny. Part of this song was featured in the Axis of Awesome's song, "Four Chords", as an example of a song that uses the I–V–vi–IV progression. This song was also featured in Procter & Gamble's Pantene Shampoo and Conditioner advertisement in 2010. However this song is still used in 2012 in Pantene Asia. It is also used in the season and series finale for another The CW show Hellcats in 2011. The song was used in a 2015 campaign for Si by Giorgio Armani featuring Cate Blanchett.

Track listings
UK CD single
 "Happy Ending" (LA Edit) – 3:32
 "Grace Kelly" (Acoustic) – 3:04
 "Happy Ending" (The Kleerup Mix) – 4:16

Limited-edition 7-inch vinyl
 "Happy Ending" (LA Edit) – 3:32
 "Love Today" (Acoustic) – 2:57

UK 12-inch single
 "Happy Ending" (Quentin Harris Remix) – 8:32
 "Happy Ending" (Quentin Harris Instrumental) – 8:14
 "Happy Ending" (The Time Of The Night Remix) – 5:40
 "Happy Ending" (Trail Mix) – 4:20

Charts

Weekly charts

Year-end charts

Certifications

References

External links
Mika's official website

2007 singles
2007 songs
Island Records singles
Mika (singer) songs
Number-one singles in Slovakia
Song recordings produced by Greg Wells
Songs written by Mika (singer)